Konstantinos Panteleimon Kiassos (born 13 December 1975) is a Greek former professional football player who mainly played for OFI, as a midfielder.

Club career
Born in Chania, Kiassos has played for OFI, Panathinaikos, Iraklis, Numancia, Panionios, Anorthosis Famagusta, Levadiakos, PAS Giannina, Enosis Neon Paralimni, Panserraikos, Apollon Smyrni, Panachaiki and Welling United.

Coaching career
In 2019 he managed Agios Nikolaos.

References

1975 births
Living people
Greek footballers
OFI Crete F.C. players
Panathinaikos F.C. players
Iraklis Thessaloniki F.C. players
CD Numancia players
Panionios F.C. players
Anorthosis Famagusta F.C. players
Levadiakos F.C. players
PAS Giannina F.C. players
Enosis Neon Paralimni FC players
Panserraikos F.C. players
Apollon Smyrnis F.C. players
Panachaiki F.C. players
Fostiras F.C. players
Welling United F.C. players
Super League Greece players
La Liga players
Cypriot First Division players
National League (English football) players
Association football midfielders
Greek expatriate footballers
Greek expatriate sportspeople in Spain
Expatriate footballers in Spain
Greek expatriate sportspeople in Cyprus
Expatriate footballers in Cyprus
Greek expatriate sportspeople in England
Expatriate footballers in England
Greek football managers
Footballers from Chania